Dahaneh Sar may refer to:
 Dahaneh-ye Sar-e Sefidrud-e Kohneh
 Dahaneh Sar-e Shijan